Sureshjai (died September 4, 1983) was a popular Indian novelist and screenwriter. Many of his novels were adapted into Hindi films in the 1960s and 1970s, including more than a dozen big hits of the period - Kaajal (1965), Kati Patang (1970), Khilona (1970), Sharmeelee (1971) and Daag (1973). His stories encompassed a range of themes, from social issues and romance to action thrillers. He was nominated for the Filmfare Award for Best Story six times, for Kaajal (1965), Neel Kamal (1968), Khilona (1970), Kati Patang (1970), Naya Zamana (1971) and Mehbooba (1976). His sons Rahul and Himanshu Nanda are veteran publicity designers for Bollywood and conceived the concept of Akshay Kumar starrer, Patiala House (2011)

Filmography

References

External links
 Re-Evaluating Gulshan Nanda

Year of birth missing
1985 deaths
Indian male screenwriters
Hindi-language writers
Indian male novelists
20th-century Indian male writers
20th-century Indian screenwriters